Guilherme de Queiróz Gonçalves (born 23 May 1990), known as Guilherme Queiróz, is a Brazilian footballer who plays for Vitória as a forward.

Club career
Born in Novo Horizonte, São Paulo, Guilherme Queiróz graduated with Atlético Sorocaba's youth setup. In 2010, he moved to Monte Azul, and made his professional debut on 6 March, coming on as a late substitute in a 1–1 away draw against Bragantino for the Campeonato Paulista championship.

In 2011 Guilherme Queiróz joined Mirassol, but after appearing sparingly he signed for Grêmio Novorizontino in 2013, after a short spell at José Bonifácio. On 9 July 2014 he was loaned to Juventude, in Série C.

On 13 May 2015 Guilherme Queiróz moved to another club in the third level, Portuguesa. He scored 12 goals in only 18 appearances, being the division's top scorer as his side missed out promotion in the quarter-finals.

On 17 December 2015 Guilherme Queiróz signed a contract with Série A club Figueirense, after being released by Lusa. He made his debut in the competition on 15 May, replacing Ferrugem in the half-time of a 0–0 home draw against Ponte Preta.

After being rarely used at Figueira, Queiróz subsequently represented Paraná and São Bento before returning to Portuguesa on 20 May 2017.

Honours

Club
Novorizontino
Campeonato Paulista Série A3: 2014

Individual
Campeonato Brasileiro Série C Top goalscorer: 2015

References

External links

1990 births
Living people
Footballers from São Paulo (state)
Brazilian footballers
Association football forwards
Campeonato Brasileiro Série A players
Campeonato Brasileiro Série B players
Campeonato Brasileiro Série C players
Campeonato Brasileiro Série D players
Atlético Monte Azul players
Mirassol Futebol Clube players
Esporte Clube Juventude players
Grêmio Novorizontino players
Associação Portuguesa de Desportos players
Figueirense FC players
Paraná Clube players
Esporte Clube São Bento players
Santa Cruz Futebol Clube players
Grêmio Esportivo Brasil players
Esporte Clube Vitória players
People from Novo Horizonte, São Paulo